Hamza Zeddam (born 8 April 1984 in Constantine) is an Algerian footballer. He currently plays for DRB Tadjenanet in the Algerian Ligue Professionnelle 1.

Club career
On 16 July 2008 Zeddam signed a two-year contract with MC Alger.

On 26 November 2011 Zeddam scored MC Algiers' only goal in the Algiers derby win against city rivals USM Alger.

Honours
 Won the Arab Champions League once with ES Sétif in 2007
 Won the Algerian Championnat National once with MC Alger in 2010

References

External links
DZFoot Profile

1984 births
Living people
Footballers from Constantine, Algeria
Algerian footballers
Algerian Ligue Professionnelle 1 players
CS Constantine players
ES Sétif players
MC Alger players
RC Arbaâ players
Association football defenders
21st-century Algerian people